The 2017 Military Bowl was a postseason college football bowl game played at Navy–Marine Corps Memorial Stadium in Annapolis, Maryland, on December 28, 2017. The game was the 10th edition of the Military Bowl and featured the Virginia Cavaliers of the Atlantic Coast Conference and the Navy Midshipmen of the American Athletic Conference. Sponsored by defense contractor Northrop Grumman, the game was officially known as the Military Bowl presented by Northrop Grumman.

Teams

Virginia Cavaliers

The Virginia Cavaliers finished the regular season with a 6–6 record. This was the team's first appearance in the Military Bowl and their first bowl appearance since 2011.

Navy Midshipmen

The Navy Midshipmen had a 6–6 record in the regular season. This was the team's third appearance in the Military Bowl; they lost in 2008 (when the game was the EagleBank Bowl) and won in 2015.

Game summary

Scoring summary

Statistics

References

2017–18 NCAA football bowl games
Military Bowl
Navy Midshipmen football bowl games
Virginia Cavaliers football bowl games
2017 in sports in Maryland
December 2017 sports events in the United States